Nicolás Vikonis Moreau (born 6 April 1984) is a Uruguayan professional footballer who plays as a goalkeeper for Liga MX club Mazatlán.

Personal life
On 31 March 2020, Vikonis and his girlfriend at the time Paola Salcedo, a Mexican model and sister of professional footballer Carlos Salcedo announced on Instagram the birth of their son, Luka Mateo.

References

External links
 
 

1984 births
Living people
Uruguayan footballers
Uruguay youth international footballers
Association football goalkeepers
Categoría Primera A players
Liverpool F.C. (Montevideo) players
Rampla Juniors players
Sportivo Cerrito players
Atlético Bucaramanga footballers
Millonarios F.C. players
Club Puebla players
Uruguayan expatriate footballers
Expatriate footballers in Colombia
Expatriate footballers in Mexico
Uruguayan people of Lithuanian descent